The Poäng is a wooden cantilever armchair that has been sold by the Swedish furniture retailer IKEA since 1978. As of 2016, about one-and-a-half million Poängs are sold annually, and a total of 30 million have been produced.

The Japanese designer, Nakamura Noboru, created the chair in 1976 in collaboration with product manager Lars Engman. Its design resembles that of the "Armchair 406," created by the Finnish designer Alvar Aalto in 1939, but it features thin upholstery instead of the 406's webbed seat. Its molded plywood frame swings slightly when a person sits in it, giving the impression of a rocking chair; Nakamura intended this to evoke a relaxing feeling. 
The design of the chair has been changed several times since its introduction. Initially named "Poem," it was renamed to "Poäng" in 1992, and the seat part was changed from tubular steel to wood, which allowed the chair to be flat-packed and led to a price reduction of 21%. The color, pattern, and material of the upholstery were also repeatedly changed to account for changing customer preferences. The Poäng's price has decreased markedly since its introduction. In the 1990s it sold for up to $350 in the U.S. (adjusted for inflation as of 2016) compared to a 2016 price of $79.

In its post-1990s form, the Poäng is composed of a frame of bent, glued beechwood veneers and solid wooden rails, finished with clear lacquer and available in various colors. The seating material consists of polypropylene support fabric and cushions made of leather or fabric filled with polyurethane foam. A matching ottoman footstool is also sold.

Ingvar Kamprad, the founder of IKEA, expressed an affinity for the Poäng, and said in 2006 that he had owned the same one for 32 years.

References

Chairs
Flatpack furniture
IKEA products
Individual models of furniture
Products introduced in 1976